Charlotte Williams-Wynn (16 January 1807 – 26 April 1869) was a British letter-writer and diarist.

Life and career
Williams-Wynn was the eldest daughter of the politician Charles Williams-Wynn and his wife Mary, daughter of Sir Foster Cunliffe, 3rd Baronet. She was named after paternal grandmother, Charlotte Williams-Wynn (née Grenville). She spent her childhood at Dropmore Park, the seat of her granduncle, William Grenville, 1st Baron Grenville. Her father's illness forced him to travel to Wiesbaden, and Williams-Wynn accompanied him. On the way from Rotterdam to Biebrich, she met and befriended the diplomat and soldier Karl August Varnhagen von Ense. Williams-Wynn travelled extensively through what is now Italy, Switzerland and Germany. She was staying in Paris at the time of the French coup of 1851, and recorded the events of the period in detail.

Williams-Wynn never married and lived at 43 Green Street, London. She formed a "close and lasting friendship" with the Prussian ambassador Christian Charles Josias von Bunsen, the writer Thomas Carlyle and the theologian Frederick Denison Maurice. In 1866, her declining health compelled her to search for a milder climate and move to Arcachon, where she died on 26 April 1869, five days after her sister Mary. She is buried in an Arcachon cemetery. Her surviving sister, Harriot Lindesay, published her memoires in 1877.

Ancestry

See also 
Charles Williams-Wynn (1822–1896), her brother

References

External links 

Charlotte Williams-Wynn

1807 births
1869 deaths
Women diarists
English diarists
English letter writers
Women letter writers
Writers from London
19th-century British women writers
19th-century British writers
19th-century diarists